Larry Thor (August 27, 1916 – March 15, 1976) was a radio newscaster and announcer, an actor in film and radio, and a university professor. He "was noted for his distinctive voice ... his rich resonant tones."

Early professional life
A native of Lundar, Manitoba, Canada, Thor was a soldier, a construction worker, a farmer, and a rancher before he went into broadcasting. His first experience in radio came in 1937 as an unpaid singer at CFAR in Flin Flon, Manitoba, Canada. He soon became the writer for CFAR, a job he held for three years. From there he went to CKGB in Timmins as an announcer. Later, he moved to CKCL in Toronto as a newscaster. In 1946, he moved to the United States, joining the staff of KFAC in Los Angeles. Following that, Thor worked at KMPC, in Hollywood, California, as a newscaster and writer. In 1948, he left KMPC and went to KNX in Hollywood as an announcer.

Radio drama
Thor's involvement with drama on radio began in Canada. In addition to his work as an announcer (noted above), he began his own company, Peak Radio Ltd., which produced radio dramas. During Thor's time on American network radio, he was an announcer for Green Lama, Rocky Jordan,  and Suspense. He was perhaps best known for starring in Broadway Is My Beat, playing Detective Danny Clover. He also was the announcer on the syndicated radio program, The Clyde Beatty Show.

Recordings
In 1964, Thor recorded a 12-song album for children. Galloping on My Dinosaur was released on the Harmony label. Thor also wrote the music and lyrics for the songs in the album.

Writing
Thor wrote his first script for an episode of Suspense. "The Man Who Cried Wolf" was broadcast February 9, 1953. He went on to write scripts for episodes of This is our Heritage, Fantasy of Fact, The Record Collectors, and Hallmark Hall of Fame. He also wrote four books.

Teaching
Thor began teaching in the screenwriting program at the University of California, Los Angeles, in January 1968, offering "a special course for the advanced writers." He continued to teach there, enhancing his courses with "many professional actors, producers and writers who were brought into his class as guest lecturers" until he died in 1976.

Family
While still in Canada, Thor married the former Leona Finnie of Winnipeg when he was 21. They had four children. In 1956, Thor married Jean Howell, an actress and writer. She divorced him after four months.

Filmography
Thor had roles in 29 feature films, as shown in the table below.

References

External links 
 
 
 Larry Thor, Theater Arts: Los Angeles – The University of California
 Galloping on My Dinosaur and Other Fun Songs for Children

1916 births
1976 deaths
Canadian radio personalities
Canadian male radio actors
Canadian male film actors
Canadian male voice actors
20th-century Canadian male actors